The Todman Stakes is an Australian Turf Club  Group 2 Thoroughbred horse race, for two-year-old colts and geldings, at set weights, over a distance of 1200 metres held at Randwick Racecourse in Sydney, Australia in March. Total prize money for the race is A$300,000.

History
The winner of this race receives automatic entry to the ATC Golden Slipper Stakes and the race is considered an important prep test due to the same distance as the Golden Slipper Stakes.

The following thoroughbreds have captured the Todman – Golden Slipper double: Luskin Star (1977), Marauding (1987), Tierce (1991),  Pierro (2012), Vancouver (2015) and Farnan (2020)

Name
The race is named after champion Todman winner of first Golden Slipper Stakes in 1957 by 8 lengths and starting at the short odds of 1/6on.

1973–2004 - Todman Slipper Trial
2005 onwards - Todman Stakes

Venue

 1973–2007 - Rosehill Gardens Racecourse
 2008 - Canterbury Park Racecourse
 2009–2014 - Rosehill Gardens Racecourse
2015 - Randwick Racecourse

Grade

1973–1978 -  Principal Race
1979–1986 -  Listed Race
1980–1985 -  Group 3
1986 onwards - Group 2

Winners

 2023 - Cylinder
 2022 - Sejardan
 2021 - Anamoe
 2020 - Farnan
 2019 - Yes Yes Yes
 2018 - Aylmerton
 2017 - Gunnison
 2016 - Kiss And Make Up
 2015 - Vancouver
 2014 - Ghibellines
 2013 - Criterion
 2012 - Pierro
 2011 - Smart Missile
 2010 - Masquerader
 2009 - Real Saga
 2008 - Krupt
 2007 - Meurice
 2006 - Diego Garcia
 2005 - Written Tycoon
 2004 - Charge Forward
 2003 - Exceed And Excel
 2002 - Snowland
 2001 - Royal Courtship
 2000 - Great Crusader
 1999 - Align
 1998 - Laurie's Lottery
 1997 - General Nediym
 1996 - Flavour
 1995 - Octagonal
 1994 - Pauillac
 1993 - Justice Prevails
 1992 - Clan O'Sullivan
 1991 - Tierce
 1990 - Auranch
 1989 - Mercury
 1988 - Full And By
 1987 - Marauding
 1986 - Haida Prince
 1985 - Asarka
 1984 - County
 1983 - Daybreak Lover     
 1982 - Mr. Mcginty   
 1981 - Crown Jester  
 1980 - Nassau  
 1979 - Dignitas' Son   
 1978 - Black Opaque  
 1977 - Luskin Star
 1976 - †Blue And Gold / Pacific Ruler   
 1975 - †Top Charer / Rosie Heir  
 1974 - Scamanda  
 1973 - Imagele   

† Run in Divisions

See also
 List of Australian Group races
 Group races

External links 
First three placegetters Todman Stakes (ATC)

References

Horse races in Australia